Tarbagatay (Tarbagata) is a rural locality (an ulus) in Zaigrayevsky District of the Republic of Buryatia, Russia. Population:

References 

Rural localities in Zaigrayevsky District